Batocera gigas is a species of beetle in the family Cerambycidae. It was described by Drapiez in 1819. It is known from Java, and is very common.

References

Batocerini
Beetles described in 1819